Golgi SNAP receptor complex member 2 is a protein that in humans is encoded by the GOSR2 gene.

Function 

This gene encodes a trafficking membrane protein which transports proteins among the medial- and trans-Golgi compartments. Due to its chromosomal location and trafficking function, this gene may be involved in familial essential hypertension. Three transcript variants encoding three different isoforms have been found for this gene.

Mutations in the GOSR2 gene are linked with North Sea progressive myoclonus epilepsy (NS-PME), a rare subtype of progressive myoclonus epilepsy that is prevalent in northern Europe.

Interactions 

GOSR2 has been shown to interact with USO1 and STX5.

References

Further reading